Videha () was an ancient Indo-Aryan tribe of north-eastern South Asia whose existence is attested during the Iron Age.

Location
The borders of the Videha kingdom were the Sadānirā river in the west, the Kauśikī river in the east, the Gaṅgā river in the south, and the Himālaya mountains in the north. To the west of the Sadānirā river, the neighbour of the Vaidehas was the kingdom of Kosala.

The Sadānirā and Kauśikī rivers remained the respective western and eastern boundaries of the later Videha republic, although its territory covered only the northern part of that of the former Videha kingdom, with the latter hence being called Mahā-Videha ("greater Videha"). The Videha republic was located along the foothills of the Himalaya mountains, in what are now the Tarāī region and the south-eastern parts of Nepal including the lower hill ranges, as well as the northern part of what in present time is the Indian state of Bihār. The Malla republics were the neighbours of Videha to the west of the Sadānirā during the republican period.

Name
The capital of the Vaidehas was the city of Mithilā, whose name was derived from that of the Vaideha king Mithi.

History

Monarchic period
The Vaidehas were an Indo-Aryan tribe in the eastern Gangetic plain in the Greater Magadha cultural region. The Prākrit name , meaning "without walls or ramparts," was an epithet used in the sense of "destroyers of walls and ramparts".

Despite being an Indo-Aryan people, the Vaidehas were not fully Brahmanised, lived in the Indo-Aryan but non-Vedic cultural region of Greater Magadha located to the east of the Gaṅgā-Yamunā confluence along with the similarly Greater Magadhan non-Vedic Indo-Aryan Kāśya and Kauśalya tribes, with whom they had close cultural relations from early times, and along with whom the Vaidehas would be continually mentioned in ancient South Asian literature. Brahmanical literature also referred to the Vaidehas and the Māgadhīs with less prestige than the Brahmanised Kuru-Pāñcālas and with language referring to mixed castes.

The Vaidehas were initially organised into a monarchical regime during the era of the s, lasting from around 900 BCE to around 700 BCE. One attested king of Mahā-Videha was Mithila, who gave his name to the tribe's capital of Mithilā.

The Vaidehas were Brahmanised during the later  period, shortly after Kosala's Brahmanisation.

This monarchical period of the Vaidehas lasted between 150 and 200 years, and the maximum estimated number of Vaideha kings during this phase amounts to eight.

Republican period
Shortly before or during the lifetime of the Buddha, around the 7th or 6th century BCE, the Licchavi tribe invaded the territory of the Mahā-Videha kingdom and temporarily occupied the Vaideha capital of Mithilā, from where they could best administer the territory of Mahā-Videha. The consequence of the occupation of Videha by the republican Licchavikas was that the Licchavikas relatively peacefully overthrew the already weakened Vaideha monarchical system and Janaka's dynasty, and replaced them by a  republican system.

Facing the rising power of Magadha to the south of the Gaṅgā, the Licchavikas established their republic in the southern part of the former Mahā-Videha kingdom's territory and moved their political centre to Vesālī, while the new Videha republic centred around Mithilā existed in a limited territory covering only the northern part of Mahā-Videha. Many members of the Vaideha aristocracy who had submitted to the Licchavikas joined them in moving to Vesālī, and therefore became members of the Licchavi ruling aristocratic Assembly. Vaideha politicians also moved to Vesālī and obtained high posts there, such as the Vaideha minister Sakala who had to flee from his colleagues' jealousy and moved to Vesālī where he became a prominent citizen and was elected ; Sakala had two sons, Gopāla and Siṃha, who both married Vesālia women, and Siṃha's daughter Vāsavī married the Māgadhī king Bimbisāra.

The Licchavikas themselves henceforth became the leading power within the territory of the former Mahā-Videha kingdom, with the Licchavika Assembly holding the sovereign and supreme rights over this territory while the Videha republic was ruled by an Assembly of the s residing in and around Mithilā, and which governed in the name of the Licchavika Assembly. The Videha republic was thus under significant influence of Licchavi, and it joined the latter as one of the two most important members of the Vajjika League, which was a temporary league led by Licchavi, with the Vaideha s holding an undetermined number out of the nine non-Licchavika seats of the eighteen-member Vajjika Council. Despite being a prominent member of the Vajjika League, Videha was a minor power within it compared to the Licchavikas and the Mallakas, and Videha maintained limited autonomy within the league concerning its domestic administration under the supervision of Licchavi, who fully controlled Vaideha foreign policy. The Videha republic's relations with other members of the Vajjika League, such as the Malla republics, were good, although occasional quarrels arose between the various member states of the league.

During the life of the Buddha, Videha abandoned Brahmanism and embraced Buddhism.

After the death of the Buddha, the Licchavikas, the Mallakas, and the Sakyas claimed shares of his relics while the Vaidehas and the Nāyikas did not appear among the list of states claiming a share because they were dependencies of the Licchavikas without their own sovereignty, and therefore could not put forth their own claim while Licchavi could.

Conquest by Magadha
The relations of the Licchavikas, who led the Vajjika League which the Vaidehas were part of, with their southern neighbour, the kingdom of Magadha, were initially good, and the wife of the Māgadhī king Bimbisāra was the Vesālia princess Vāsavī, who was the daughter of the Licchavika  Sakala's son Siṃha. There were nevertheless occasional tensions between Licchavi and Magadha, such as the competition at the Mallaka capital of Kusinārā over acquiring the relics of the Buddha after his death.

In another case, the Licchavikas once invaded Māgadhī territory from across the Gaṅgā, and at some point the relations between Magadha and Licchavi permanently deteriorated as result of a grave offence committed by the Licchavikas towards the Māgadhī king Bimbisāra.

The hostilities between Licchavi and Magadha continued under the rule of Ajātasattu, who was Bimbisāra's son with another Licchavika princess, Vāsavī, after he had killed Bimbisāra and usurped the throne of Magadha. Eventually Licchavi supported a revolt against Ajātasattu by his younger step-brother and the governor of Aṅga, Vehalla, who was the son of Bimbisāra by another Licchavika wife of his, Cellanā, a daughter of Ceḍaga, who was the head of both the Licchavi republic and the Vajjika League; Bimbisāra had chosen Vehalla as his successor following Ajātasattu's falling out of his favour after the latter had been caught conspiring against him, and the Licchavikas had attempted to place Vehalla on the throne of Magadha after Ajātasattu's usurpation and had allowed Vehalla to use their capital Vesālī as base for his revolt. After the failure of this rebellion, Vehalla sought refuge at his grandfather's place in the Licchavika and Vajjika capital of Vesālī, following which Ajātasattu repeatedly attempted to negotiate with the Licchavikas-Vajjikas. After Ajātasattu's repeated negotiation attempts ended in failure, he declared war on the Vajjika League in 484 BCE.

Tensions between Licchavi and Magadha were exacerbated by the handling of the joint Māgadhī-Licchavika border post of Koṭigāma on the Gaṅgā by the Licchavika-led Vajjika League who would regularly collect all valuables from Koṭigāma and leave none to the Māgadhīs. Therefore Ajātasattu decided to destroy the Vajjika League in retaliation, but also because, as an ambitious empire-builder whose mother Vāsavī was Licchavika princess of Vaidehī descent, he was interested in the territory of the former Mahā-Videha kingdom which by then was part of the Vajjika League. Ajātasattu's hostility towards the Vajjika League was also the result of the differing forms of political organisation between Magadha and the Vajjika League, with the former being monarchical and the latter being republican, not unlike the opposition of the ancient Greek kingdom of Sparta to the democratic form of government in Athens, and the hostilities between the ancient Macedonian king Philip II to the Athenian and Theban republics.

As a prominent member of the Vajjika League, the Videha republic was also threatened by Ajātasattu, and it therefore fought on the side of the other confederate tribes of the league against Magadha. The military forces of the Vajjika League were initially too strong for Ajātasattu to be successful against them, and it required him having recourse to diplomacy and intrigues over the span of a decade to finally defeat the Vajjika League by 468 BCE and annex its territories, including Videha, to the kingdom of Magadha. Mention of the Vaidehas end after the Māgadhī conquest, and Kauṭilya and Pāṇini did not mention them as an independent polity, but instead included them as part of Vṛji (the country of Mahā-Videha, which by then was known by the name of the Vajjika League).

Social and political organisation

Monarchical institutions

Republican institutions

The Assembly
Like the Licchavikas, the republican Vaideha  (aristocratic oligarchic republic) had their own ruling Assembly. The Vaidehas, like their Licchavika, Mallaka, Nāyika confederates within the Vajjika League, were a  tribe, and the Vaidehas' Assembly was largely constituted of the heads of the  clans of the tribe, although it was smaller than the Licchavika Assembly and the heads of non- clans were allowed to join it: s were either allowed to become members of the Assembly or, as  heads of families, were able to influence it; since Mithilā was a centre of trade, wealthy merchants also either were members of the Assembly or were able to influence it. Of the 84,000 to 100,000 population of Videha, the 6,000 heads of the  clans were automatically accorded membership within the Vaideha Assembly (called s, meaning "ruler"), similarly to how membership to the Licchavika Assembly functioned.

Like the Licchavika Assembly, the Vaideha Assembly possessed a santhāgāra as meeting place, although it normally met only once a year.

The  (Consul)

The Council
Since the Vaideha Assembly met only once a year, it was the Council, that is the inner body of the Assembly, which met more frequently to administer the Videha republic. The Vaideha Council was the body with the supreme authority of the internal administration of the republic, although in practice it held the supreme power of the republic under the administration of the Licchavikas.

The Council also received envoys of other states and took important decisions in the name of the Assembly, which had to approve them.

Courtesanry
An unusual custom of the Vaidehas was that every one of their villages and towns had a dancing girl of courtesan, and Videha had a troop composed of panegyrists, music instrument players, and those dancing girls who were considered to be the most beautiful.

At the state level, a beauty competition was held to choose who was the most beautiful woman of the whole state.

Legacy
Beginning with the Gupta period, the names Mithilā and Tirabhukti replaced that of Videha as the appellation of the whole former territory of the Mahā-Videha kingdom.

Videha and Mithilā appear in the later Itihasa texts such as the Rāmāyaṇa and the Mahābhārata, with the protagonist of the being the Vaidehī princess Sītā. The narrative of these epics is based on the monarchical period of Videha.

Rulers 
There were 52 Janaka (kings) ruled Videha dynasty of Mithila-

 Mithi - (founder of Mithila and the first Janaka)
 Udavasu
 Nandivardhana
 Suketu
 Devarata
 Brihadvrata
 Mahavira
 Sudhriti
 Dristaketu
 Haryasva
 Maru
 Pratindhaka
 Kritiratha
 Devamidha
 Vibhuta
 Mahidhrata
 Kirtirata
 Mahorama
 Swarnorama
 Hrisvaroma
 Seeradhwaja (father of Sita)
 Bhaanumaan
 Shatadyumn
 Shuchi
 Oorjnaamaa
 Kriti
 Anjan
 Kurujit
 Arishtnemi
 Shrutaayu
 Supaarshwa
 Srinjaya
 Kshemaavee
 Anenaa
 Bhaumarath
 Satyarath
 Upagu
 Upagupt
 Swaagat
 Swaanand
 Suvarchaa
 Supaarshwa
 Subhaash
 Sushrut
 Jaya
 Vijaya
 Rit
 Sunaya
 Veetahavya
 Dhriti
 Bahulaashwa
 Kriti - (last King of Videha or Janaka dynasty, Kirti Janak was atrocious ruler who lost control over his subjects. He was dethroned by public under leadership of Acharyas (Learned Men).

During this period of fall of Videha dynasty, the famous republic of Licchavi was rising in Vaishali and Mithila region came under control of Licchavi clan of Vajji confederacy in around eight century BCE.

See also 
 Maithils
 Vedic period
 Mithila, India
 Mithila (region)
 History of India
 History of Hinduism
 History of Mithila Region
 Ancient Mithila University
 Janapada and Mahajanapada

Notes

References

Citations

Sources

 
Mahabharata of Krishna Dwaipayana Vyasa, translated to English by Kisari Mohan Ganguli

External links

Gaṇa saṅghas
Mithila
Kingdoms in the Ramayana
Historical Indian regions
History of Bihar
Populated places in Mithila, India
1st millennium BC in India
9th-century BC establishments
5th-century BC disestablishments in India
Dynasties of Nepal
1st millennium BC in Nepal